Mauro Fraresso (born 13 January 1993) is an Italian male javelin thrower.

Biography
In winter 2019 he established the  second best Italian measure of all-time and at that moment the best measure in the world top lists IAAF.

Personal best
Javelin throw: 81.79 m (Lucca, 24 February 2019)

National titles
He has won 6 times the individual national championship.
 Italian Athletics Championships
 Javelin  throw: 2017, 2018, 2019
 Italian Winter Throwing Championships
 Javelin throw: 2017, 2018, 2019

See also
 Italian all-time lists - Javelin throw

References

External links

1993 births
Living people
Italian male javelin throwers
Athletics competitors of Fiamme Gialle
Italian Athletics Championships winners
21st-century Italian people